Cosgrove Ice Shelf is a  long by  wide ice shelf, occupying the inner (east) part of the embayment between King Peninsula and Canisteo Peninsula, Antarctica. It was mapped from air photos taken by U.S. Navy Operation Highjump, 1946–47, and named by the Advisory Committee on Antarctic Names for Lieutenant Jerome R. Cosgrove, U.S. Navy Reserve, assistant communications officer on the staff of the Commander, U.S. Navy Support Force, Antarctica, during U.S. Navy Operation Deep Freeze, 1967 and 1968.

See also 
 Ice shelves of Antarctica

Further reading 
 Ute Christina Herzfeld, Atlas of Antarctica: Topographic Maps from Geostatistical Analysis of Satellite Radar Altimeter Data, P 198
 Smith, J.A., Graham, A.G.C., Post, A.L. et al., The marine geological imprint of Antarctic ice shelves, Nat Commun 10, 5635 (2019). https://doi.org/10.1038/s41467-019-13496-5
 Biddle, L.C., K.J. Heywood, J. Kaiser, and A. Jenkins, 2017, Glacial Meltwater Identification in the Amundsen Sea, J. Phys. Oceanogr., 47, 933–954, https://doi.org/10.1175/JPO-D-16-0221.1
 Minzoni, R. T., Majewski, W., Anderson, J. B., Yokoyama, Y., Fernandez, R., & Jakobsson, M. (2017), Oceanographic influences on the stability of the Cosgrove Ice Shelf, Antarctica, The Holocene, 27(11), 1645–1658. https://doi.org/10.1177/0959683617702226

References 

Ice shelves of Antarctica
Bodies of ice of Ellsworth Land